Eutreta apicata is a species of tephritid or fruit flies in the genus Eutreta of the family Tephritidae.

Distribution
Mexico, Guatemala, Costa Rica.

References

Tephritinae
Insects described in 1935
Diptera of North America